The House at 113 Salem Street in Wakefield, Massachusetts is a rare well-preserved example of a 19th-century shoemaker's shop.  The -story wood-frame house was built in the 1840s or 1850s, and was originally the shoe shop of David Nichols, who lived at 103 Salem Street.  Its early form, with the high-pitch, gable roof, is readily recognizable despite later alterations and additions.  These types of buildings were once common in the town, where shoemaking was a home-based cottage industry.

The house was listed on the National Register of Historic Places in 1989.

See also
National Register of Historic Places listings in Wakefield, Massachusetts
National Register of Historic Places listings in Middlesex County, Massachusetts

References

Houses on the National Register of Historic Places in Wakefield, Massachusetts
Houses in Wakefield, Massachusetts